David Kelly Littleproud (born 4 September 1976) is an Australian politician who has been the leader of the National Party since May 2022. He has represented the Queensland seat of Maranoa since the 2016 federal election and was a cabinet minister in the Turnbull and Morrison governments.

Littleproud grew up in Chinchilla, Queensland, the son of former state government minister Brian Littleproud. He worked as an agribusiness banker with NAB and Suncorp before entering politics. He was first elected to the House of Representatives in 2016. Littleproud was appointed to cabinet the following year, subsequently serving as Minister for Agriculture and Water Resources (2017–2019), Water Resources, Drought, Rural Finance, Natural Disaster and Emergency Management (2019–2020), Agriculture, Drought and Emergency Management (2020–2021), and Agriculture and Northern Australia (2021–2022). He was elected deputy leader of the Nationals in February 2020 under Michael McCormack. He retained the position under Barnaby Joyce and successfully challenged Joyce for the leadership following the Coalition's defeat at the 2022 election.

Early life
Littleproud was born in Chinchilla, Queensland. His grandfather George Littleproud served on the Chinchilla Shire Council, while his father Brian Littleproud was a state Nationals MP and government minister. He attended Chinchilla State High School and Toowoomba Grammar School. As of 2019, he was one of the two members of the national cabinet who had no tertiary qualification. 

Littleproud was an agribusiness banker before entering politics. He spent 17 years with the National Australia Bank (NAB), including 12 years based in Warwick, Queensland, as district manager (agribusiness and commercial). He joined Suncorp in 2011 as executive manager (business and agribusiness banking) for South West Queensland. , Littleproud was the owner of Mr Rental Southern Downs, a rent-to-buy business that employed four people.

Political career

Littleproud was elected to parliament in 2016, succeeding retiring Nationals MP Bruce Scott.

Within 18 months, Littleproud was elevated directly to cabinet as Minister for Agriculture and Water Resources, following a reshuffle of the Second Turnbull Ministry. He was sworn in at Government House in Canberra on 20 December 2017.

In November 2018, Littleproud was additionally appointed Minister Assisting the Prime Minister for Drought Preparation and Response. Following the Morrison Government's return at the 2019 federal election, his title was changed to Minister for Water Resources, Drought, Rural Finance, Natural Disaster and Emergency Management. He re-assumed the agriculture portfolio following Bridget McKenzie's resignation in February 2020, becoming Minister for Agriculture, Drought and Emergency Management.

Deputy leadership
Littleproud was viewed as a potential candidate to replace Barnaby Joyce as National Party leader in February 2018. The position was eventually won by Michael McCormack. On 4 February 2020, following [
Bridget McKenzie's resignation, he defeated Keith Pitt and David Gillespie to become deputy leader of the National Party. The ballot for the deputy leadership was held simultaneously with a leadership spill in which McCormack defeated a challenge by Joyce. It was subsequently suggested that Littleproud could emerge as a compromise candidate if conflict continues between supporters of McCormack and Joyce.

Leadership of National Party 
Littleproud challenged incumbent Nationals Party leader Barnaby Joyce along with Darren Chester in a three-way contest for the leadership of the party on 30 May 2022 after the incumbent Liberal/National Coalition government lost office to the Labor opposition. The Nationals party room got bigger, however, their coalition partner suffered massive seat losses due to Joyce's unpopularity in those particular seats being used against them.  Littleproud was elected Leader of the National Party with Perin Davey as deputy, replacing Joyce.

Political positions

Murray-Darling Basin

On 14 February 2018, Labor voted with the Greens to disallow a mechanism in the Murray Darling Basin Plan which would have prevented farmers in the Northern Basin giving up  of water which otherwise would have been lost to seepage and evaporation. The disallowance motion triggered a crisis in basin states when New South Wales and Victoria pledged to abandon the Plan as a result. It was widely considered the withdrawal of the two largest states would see the Basin Plan dismantled after it had taken more than a century to strike the agreement. On 7 May 2018, in the lead up to a second disallowance motion that would have blocked 36 environmental water savings projects, Littleproud struck a deal with Labor that both secured the works in question and the 70 GL recovery reduction for Northern Basin farmers which had previously been disallowed. This effectively resurrected the Murray-Darling Basin Plan by reassuring Basin states the Plan would be fulfilled as agreed in 2012. In addition to securing the Basin Plan, Littleproud delivered enhanced protections for Aboriginal people in the Basin. This included an Indigenous position on the MDBA board and a world-first $40 million indigenous fund so Aboriginal communities could buy water for either cultural or economic purposes.

Regional Investment Corporation

Littleproud successfully negotiated with the Senate cross bench for passage of legislation establishing the Regional Investment Corporation. On 6 February 2018 the new laws passed the upper house, breaking a political deadlock that had dragged on months. On 16 May 2018 it was announced that the RIC's headquarters would be set up in Orange, New South Wales, fulfilling in part the Nationals' commitment to deliver public service jobs to regional areas.

Same-sex marriage
In December 2017, Littleproud was one of four members of the House of Representatives to vote against the Marriage Amendment (Definition and Religious Freedoms) Bill 2017, which legalised same-sex marriage in Australia. Littleproud had pledged to vote according to the majority response of his electorate of Maranoa in the Australian Marriage Law Postal Survey, and Maranoa recorded a result of 56.1% against changing the definition of marriage.

Personal life
Littleproud has three children. He and his wife Sarah announced their separation in 2019, ending a 20-year marriage.

As on 23 October 2021, Littleproud possesses a large share portfolio in the resources industry: he owns shares in BHP, mining company South32, oil and gas exploration company Blue Energy, iron ore company Atlas and engineering company Ausenco.

References

Living people
1976 births
Leaders of the National Party of Australia
Members of the Australian House of Representatives for Maranoa
Members of the Australian House of Representatives
Liberal National Party of Queensland members of the Parliament of Australia
National Party of Australia members of the Parliament of Australia
21st-century Australian politicians
Government ministers of Australia
Members of the Cabinet of Australia
Turnbull Government
Morrison Government